The 2004 African Cup of Nations Final was a football match that took place on 14 February 2004 at the Stade 7 November in Radès, Tunisia, to determine the winner of the 2004 African Cup of Nations, the football championship of Africa organized by the Confederation of African Football (CAF).

Tunisia won the title for the first time by beating Morocco 2–1.

Road to the final

Match details

Summary 
In the final on 14 February 2004 at the Stade 7 November in Radès, in front of 70,000 supporters, Tunisia got off to a good start with a lead 1–0 after four minutes thanks to Mehdi Nafti centered on Francileudo Santos, who scored his fourth goal of the tournament. At the end of the first half, Morocco came back to score with a goal from Youssouf Hadji on a lift from Youssef Mokhtari.

Seven minutes passed in the second half before another Tunisian striker, Ziad Jaziri, gave his country the lead. The match finally ends with the score of 2–1, giving Tunisia their first Africa Cup of Nations. Khaled Badra and Riadh Bouazizi lift the cup after receiving it from President Zine El Abidine Ben Ali. The Carthage Eagles are the 13th selection in history to be crowned African champions.

Roger Lemerre also becomes the first coach to win two different continental tournaments. The national team also won the African National Team of the Year award from the Confederation of African Football. The victory gave rise to the team's nickname, the "Eagles of Carthage" and, as a result, the team's badge was changed to incorporate an eagle.

Details

References

Final
2004
Tunisia national football team matches
Morocco national football team matches
February 2004 sports events in Africa
Sports competitions in Radès
21st century in Radès
Africa
Africa Cup of Nations Final